Williamstown is a mixed-use suburb of Kalgoorlie-Boulder, a city in the Eastern Goldfields region of Western Australia.

It is located to the east of the main Kalgoorlie townsite, and is separated from other residential areas by the Goldfields Highway. It contains the Mount Charlotte Gold Mine.

References